Magi-Nation Duel, sometimes abbreviated "MND" or simply Magi-Nation, is an out-of-print collectible card game (CCG) published by Interactive Imagination Corp (2i) in October 2000. It was previewed at Gen Con 2000 and was released in October 2000. Lead Designer and Co-Founder of 2i Phillip Tavel created a game with mechanics which resembled and were partially based on Magic: The Gathering, while much of the flavor of the game was based on the anime-style artwork of Matt Holmberg. Greg Richardson Von Oy (the other original Co-Founder of 2i) and Josh Lytle (a former professional gamer) helped to playtest and finalize the original design of the game. Several manga-style American artists led by Art Director: Thomas Cook include Matt Holmberg, Rich Werner (Main character designer for Kybar's Teeth, Weave, Paradwyn, Bograth, Nar and The Sands of Dresh), Tim Gillette, Chana Goodman, and Ryan Shreve helped to expand the universe of art based on the original creations of Matt Holmberg. The game was originally designed as a bridge between Pokémon and Magic: The Gathering. The idea was that younger players whose first game was Pokémon would eventually seek out a new game to play and that Magic: The Gathering might be too complex for some players, leaving a void in the market between the two massively popular card games. The game is now out of print. A new version of the game, licensed by Cookie Jar tm, was to be released in 2008, but no relaunch ever surfaced.

The game had an active following which later released a number of cards 2i had in development, as well as a number of fan cards. These cards were previously found at CCGWorkshop, however as of January 2008, they no longer available as 2i had requested their removal.

Expansions

The first card set, which is also known as Limited, contained 190 cards and introduced five "regions" of the larger world called the "Moonlands": Arderial, Cald, Naroom, Orothe, and Underneath. A reprint of the base set, known as Unlimited, was released in February 2001. This set contained a full parallel set of "foil" premium cards, whereas the base set only had foil versions of selected cards.

Four additional sets were created as expansions to the game, designed by Dan Tibbles and Stephen McLaughlin:

Awakening (144 cards, released May 2001): This set introduced a new region, the Core, and provided preview cards (one "Hyren" creature each) for the regions of Weave and Kybar's Teeth. This set also featured a Shadow Magi for d'Resh, a region not released until Voice of the Storms.
Dream's End (185 cards, released November 2001): This set officially introduced the Weave and Kybar's Teeth regions, and included two preview cards for Bograth and Paradwyn. This set also saw the introduction of dual-region cards.
Nightmare's Dawn (300 cards, released April 2002): The regions of Bograth and Paradwyn were officially introduced in this set, which also included seven d'Resh cards and two Nar cards.
Voice of the Storms (300 cards, released November 2002): The last two regions, d'Resh and Nar, were fully introduced in this set.

Each region specializes in particular gameplay tactics, be they defensive, offensive, manipulation or denial. A fifth expansion, named Traitor's Reach, was developed but never printed. 2i has announced a future expansion entitled Daybreak, which is supposed to be a 150-card set with no new regions. They have also announced plans for a new base set called Second Order, which will likely feature previously released cards with revised texts and possible alternate artwork.

2i supplied prize support for organized tournaments and leagues as well, including promotional cards that were only available for completing each league "season" and cards that could only be obtained by defeating a representative of Interactive Imagination. Seven league seasons were published, based on the regions of Naroom, Underneath, Cald, Orothe, Arderial, Core, and Kybar's Teeth, in that order.

MND Japan
A release of the base set (Unlimited) in Japan followed the US release of Dream's End. Alongside the CCG release ran a manga series in a shōnen digest, and a GBA remake of the original Magi-Nation video game. The main character of the game, Tony, was replaced with Dan, a character of a more Asian-friendly appearance. Several promotional cards were released that were only available with the manga series, and the Awakening set was published as well, but no further development is forthcoming.

Other media

Other card games
Magi-Nation and the 2i art team were featured in the first edition of The Origins Metagame produced by Flying Buffalo Games.

Newsletter
A newsletter, named The Book of Ages, was released to fans sporadically, each issue containing promotional cards, articles, artwork and fiction. Five issues were printed, and a sixth was available online.

Handhelds

In an attempt to popularize the brand, 2i also developed a Game Boy Color role-playing video game cartridge, titled Magi Nation, which met with some success. A sequel, Magi Nation: Invasion, was in development for the Game Boy Advance (GBA), but production ceased for an undisclosed reason. 

Magi Nation: Keeper's Quest is a puzzle game, produced originally for the Game Boy Color, but due to bad timing, it was never released on that platform. Instead, it was released for Palm PDAs and Verizon and Handango cell phones.

Animation

The licensing agreement to produce the Magi-Nation animated series was finalized in September 2005 with a multinational studio. In October 2006, Cookie Jar Entertainment confirmed production of its animated adaptation of the Magi-Nation series. A MIPCOM Jr. newsletter gave a brief synopsis of the show:

In February 2007, it was officially announced that Cookie Jar Entertainment's Magi-Nation had been picked up by Kids WB! in the United States and by CBC in Canada. There has been an initial production run of 26 episodes. In addition, the series is a Canada-Korea co-production.

On September 8, it premiered in Canada at 10:30 am EST. Three weeks later, on September 22, 2007, at 7:30 am EST, the Magi-Nation tv series premiered on Kids WB.

Massive multiplayer online
"Magi-Nation: Battle for the Moonlands" developed by Frima Studio, entered open Beta in February 2008, and could be found on their website at www.magi-nation.com or directly on www.magi-nation.net. The game has since been shut down.

Further reading
Strategy in Scrye #52

References

External links
 Official Website
 Official Company Homepage
 Official Japanese Homepage

Card games introduced in 2000
Collectible card games